The 2004 United States Senate election in Arkansas took place on November 2, 2004 alongside other elections to the United States Senate in other states as well as elections to the United States House of Representatives and various state and local elections.

Incumbent Democratic U.S. Senator Blanche Lincoln won re-election to a second term in office, while President George W. Bush carried the state with almost the same margin of victory. , this was the last time the Democrats have won the Class 3 Senate seat from Arkansas.

Background
Incumbent Democrat Blanche Lincoln ran for re-election. Lincoln won re-election over Republican State Senator Jim Holt while President George W. Bush carried the state with almost the same margin of victory.

The Democratic Party held super-majority status in the Arkansas General Assembly. A majority of local and statewide offices were also held by Democrats. This was rare in the modern South, where a majority of statewide offices are held by Republicans. Arkansas had the distinction in 1992 of being the only state in the country to give the majority of its vote to a single candidate in the presidential election—native son Bill Clinton—while every other state's electoral votes were won by pluralities of the vote among the three candidates. Arkansas has become more reliably Republican in presidential elections in recent years. The state voted for John McCain in 2008 by a margin of 20 percentage points, making it one of the few states in the country to vote more Republican than it had in 2004, the others being Louisiana, Oklahoma, Tennessee and West Virginia. Obama's relatively poor showing in Arkansas was likely due to a lack of enthusiasm from state Democrats following former Arkansas First Lady Hillary Clinton's failure to win the nomination, and his relatively poor performance among rural white voters (Clinton, however, herself lost the state by an even greater margin as the Democratic nominee in 2016).

Democrats had an overwhelming majority of registered voters, the Democratic Party of Arkansas is more conservative than the national entity. Two of Arkansas' three Democratic Representatives were members of the Blue Dog Coalition, which tends to be more pro-business, pro-military, and socially conservative than the center-left Democratic mainstream. Reflecting the state's large evangelical population, the state has a strong social conservative bent. Under the Arkansas Constitution Arkansas is a right to work state, its voters passed a ban on same-sex marriage with 74% voting yes, and the state is one of a handful that had legislation on its books banning abortion in the event of Roe vs. Wade being overturned.

Republican primary

Candidates
Rosemarie Clampitt, retired actress
Jim Holt, State Senator
Andy Lee, Benton County Sheriff

Results

General election

Candidates
Blanche Lincoln (D), Incumbent U.S. Senator
Jim Holt (R), State Senator

Campaign 
Lincoln was a popular incumbent. In March, she had an approval rating of 55%. Lincoln called herself an advocate for rural America, having grown up on a farm herself. Holt was from Northwest Arkansas, and was  also living on a farm. Holt was widely known as a long shot. By the end of June, he had raised just $29,000, while Lincoln had over $5 million cash on hand.

Debates
Complete video of debate, October 28, 2004

Predictions

Polling

Results

See also 
 2004 United States Senate elections
 2002 United States Senate election in Arkansas
 2008 United States Senate election in Arkansas

Notes

References 

2004
United States Senate
Arkansas